beatmania III is a rhythm video game created by Konami. Gameplay is essentially the same as in the beatmania series, with a few enhancements to the hardware.

The beatmania III series was relatively short-lived, spanning only 2 years. It had five releases, the last one being Beatmania III The Final in 2002.

Hardware

Audio system
beatmania III cabinets feature a total of 10 speakers. There are four mid-range speakers stacked vertically on either side of the screen, and two subwoofers located on the front of the machine. The cabinet also features a pair of headphone jacks, so that both players may use their own headphones to enjoy the game's audio. Using headphones does not disable the external speakers.

Effector system
Whereas the original Beatmania features simply an "Effector" button, beatmania III has an extensive panel for using a number of different effectors. Available effectors vary widely, including Echo, Low Pass, High Pass, Flanger, Phaser, Volume Bass, Lo-Fi, and several others. The chosen effector can be applied to just the background track, just the sounds created by the player, or both, and the intensity of the effect can be adjusted with two parameter knobs. Enabling the effector is achieved by simply pressing the foot pedal.

Foot pedal
While the original 5-keys-and-turntable layout remains unchanged, beatmania III adds a foot pedal for each player. In normal play, this enables or disables different sound-altering effectors. Some songs have a "foot" version that adds a seventh column with green note bars that is played by using the foot pedal. The game also allows players to set the foot pedal so that it functions as any one of the game's 5 keys.

Floppy drive
beatmania III has a feature unique to the Bemani series: a 3.5-inch floppy disk drive. By inserting any blank Windows-formatted disk before starting, the player can have the game create files on the disk used to record personal best scores. After playing, the disk is then removed from the drive for later repeated use in beatmania III, or for looking at scores using one's personal computer. The floppy disk was also required to unlock secret songs or game modes on some versions of the game.

Releases

The beatmania III series was only released as an arcade game. No console releases were ever produced even though both Japanese and North American IIDX controllers have input ports for a bass pedal. Each release added songs from the Beatmania games their titles refer to, including most previous arcade releases.

References

External links
beatmania III GATEWAY – Konami's official website in Japanese (mirror site)

2000 video games
Arcade video games
Arcade-only video games
Bemani games
 
Japan-exclusive video games
Video games developed in Japan
Multiplayer and single-player video games